Word Up! is an album by American funk group Cameo, released in 1986. The album reached number 1 on the Top R&B/Hip-Hop Albums chart, number 8 on the Billboard Pop Albums chart, and was certified Platinum by the RIAA for sales of over 1 million copies. It took Cameo to their highest level of popularity, and solidified them as one of the most successful bands of the 1980s. The album includes three of their biggest hit singles, "Word Up!", "Candy", and "Back and Forth".

Track listing

Tracks 1, 2, 3, 6 & 7 published by All Seeing Eye Music-Better Days Music.
Tracks 4 & 5 published by All Seeing Eye Music-Better Days Music-Better Nights Music.

Personnel

Cameo
Larry Blackmon – lead vocals, bass guitar, drums, percussion, backing vocals
Tomi Jenkins – lead vocals, backing vocals
Nathan Leftenant – backing vocals

Other players
Kevin Kendrick - Keyboards
Charlie Singleton – guitar, backing vocals
Aaron Mills – bass guitar
Michael Burnett – bass guitar, backing vocals
Bernard Wright, Eric Rehl, Kenni Hairston, Kevin Kendrick, Merv de Peyer – keyboards
Duduka Fonseca, Giovanni Hidalgo, Steve Thornton – percussion
Melvin Wells – saxophone, backing vocals
Michael Brecker – tenor saxophone (solo on "Candy", "Don't Be Lonely" and "She's Mine")
Randy Brecker – trumpet
Arno Hecht – tenor saxophone
Crispin Cioe – alto saxophone, baritone saxophone
Robert Funk – trombone
Paul Litteral – trumpet
Sammy Merendino – drum programming
Pat Buchanan – guitars
Peter Scherer – Synclavier programming
Willie Morris – backing vocals

Critical reception

Accolades 
Word Up! was ranked number 5 among the "Albums of the Year" by NME.

Charts and certifications

Weekly charts

Certifications

Singles 
"Word Up" – released July 1986
"Candy" – released November 1986
"Back and Forth" – released March 1987
"She's Mine" - released June 1987

References 

Cameo (band) albums
1986 albums